Chosen People Ministries (CPM) is an evangelical Christian nonprofit organization which engages in proselytization of Jews.   It is headquartered in New York City and currently led by Mitch Glaser, who was raised Jewish and converted to Christianity.

Its stated mission is to "pray for, evangelize, disciple, and serve Jewish people everywhere and to help fellow believers do the same." It supports the establishment of Messianic Jewish congregations, which it describes as "faith communities that stress the Jewish context of the Gospel of Jesus."

History 
Leopold Cohn, a Hungarian-Jewish immigrant to the United States who became a Christian, founded the Brownsville Mission to the Jews in 1894. The Brownsville Mission was later relocated to the Williamsburg section of Brooklyn, New York and became the Williamsburg Mission to the Jews from 1897 until 1924. In 1897, the Williamsburg Mission headquarters housed a medical clinic, boys' club, Girl Scouts, and sewing and English classes, in addition to evening Gospel services.

From 1924 until 1984 it was known as the American Board of Missions to the Jews. Since then it has been known by its current name, Chosen People Ministries.

Methods and locations 
Chosen People Ministries has staff in 16 countries around the world, and planting Messianic Centers and congregations as the main focus of its work.  It also sends out missionaries and conducts evangelism in areas of high Jewish concentration, teaches in churches, and produces evangelical literature and media. The organization has ties with evangelical seminaries and often hosts conferences on topics relating to Jewish evangelism and theological matters. The organization also uses media outreach on digital platforms, including the website Isaiah53.com, and a cooperation with the Israeli-based ministry of One for Israel for producing a series of Messianic Jewish testimony videos called I Found Shalom.

Messianic Centers

Jerusalem, Israel 
In 2007, Chosen People Ministries opened a Messianic Center in Jerusalem. The organization uses the facility to minister to Holocaust survivors, as well as hosting benevolence ministries, and a place to host short-term outreach teams.

Brooklyn, New York - The Charles L. Feinberg Center 

In 2010, Chosen People Ministries attracted attention when it acquired a former funeral home in the heart of an Orthodox Jewish community located in Midwood, Brooklyn. This acquisition has sparked anger from the Jewish community in New York. The Center opened in 2014 and currently houses an English-speaking congregation, a Russian-speaking congregation, and an accredited seminary program.

The seminary program, The Charles L. Feinberg Center for Messianic Jewish Studies, is co-sponsored with Talbot School of Theology and offers an accredited Master of Divinity program in Messianic Jewish Studies. The program is designed to train Messianic congregational leaders, outreach workers and educators.  In addition to the full Master of Divinity program, it offers a 6-course Certificate in Messianic Jewish studies.  Classes are held in Brooklyn at the Feinberg Center, though the summer program includes classes at Talbot's Los Angeles campus.

Berlin, Germany 
In 2012, the organization opened one of the first buildings dedicated to Jewish evangelism in Europe since World War II in Berlin, Germany. The Berlin center hosts a hospitality network, Shabbat fellowships, tandem language partnerships, and friendship ministries.

Ramat Gan, Israel 
In 2017, Chosen People Ministries opened a Messianic Center in the Ramat Gan area of Greater Tel Aviv. The center hosts seminars on parenting, financial management, biblical counseling, as well as a bi-weekly women's Bible study.

Church affiliations and memberships 
Chosen People Ministries states that it is a member of the Evangelical Council for Financial Accountability, CrossGlobal Link, the Canadian Council of Christian Charities, the Christian Stewardship Association and the Evangelical Fellowship of Canada.

References

External links
 Official web site
 Evangelizing the chosen people: missions to the Jews in America, by Yaakov Shalom Ariel, published in 2000

1894 establishments in New York (state)
Christianity in New York (state)
Christian missionary societies
Christian organizations established in the 19th century
Messianic Judaism
Organizations based in New York City
Religious organizations established in 1894
Conversion of Jews to Christianity